Music for the Mature B-Boy is the first studio album by DJ Format.

Track listing
 "Intro
 "Ill Culinary Behaviour" (featuring Abdominal)
 "We Know Something You Don't Know" (featuring Chali 2na & Akil)
 "Last Bongo In Brighton (Remix)"
 "The Hit Song" (featuring Abdominal)
 "Here Comes The Fuzz"
 "B-Boy Code Pt.2" (featuring Fatski)
 "Vicious Battle Raps" (featuring Abdominal)
 "Charity Shop Sound Clash" (featuring Aspects)
 "Little Bit Of Soul"
 "English Lesson (Remix)"

Singles
UK singles with release dates:
 "We Know Something You Don't Know" (10 March 2003)
 "The Hit Song" (23 June 2003)
 "Vicious Battle Raps" (27 October 2003)

References

2003 debut albums
DJ Format albums